The following outline is provided as an overview of and topical guide to the Northwest Territories:

The Northwest Territories – The Northwest Territories is a federal territory of Canada. Its estimated population as of 2018 is 44,445.

The Northwest Territories is bordered by Canada's two other territories, Nunavut to the east and Yukon to the west, and by the provinces of British Columbia, Alberta, and Saskatchewan to the south.

General reference 

 Alternate name(s):
les Territoires du Nord-Ouest (French)
Denendeh (Athabaskan languages)
Nunatsiaq (Inuinnaqtun)
 (Inuktitut)
 Pronunciation:
 Adjectival(s): Northwest Territorian   ("N.W.T.")
 Demonym(s): Northwest Territorian
 Postal code: X0, X1 (Yellowknife)

History of the Northwest Territories 

History of the Northwest Territories
History of the North-Western Territory
List of lieutenant governors of the Northwest Territories
History of Northwest Territories capital cities
Timeline of Yellowknife history
Yellowknife Historical Society
The Carrothers Commission

Districts of the Northwest Territories

Historic places in the Northwest Territories
National Historic Sites in the Northwest Territories

Geography of the Northwest Territories 

Geography of Northwest Territories
 The Northwest Territories is: a territory in Northern Canada
 Population of the Northwest Territories: 41,786
 Area of the Northwest Territories: 1,143,793.86 km2

Location 

 the Northwest Territories is situated within the following regions:
 Time zone(s): UTC−7
 Highest point of the Northwest Territories

Environment of the Northwest Territories 
Environment of Canada
 Climate of the Northwest Territories
Climate change in the Arctic
 Geology of the Northwest Territories
 Protected areas of the Northwest Territories
Birds of the Northwest Territories

Ecology of the Northwest Territories 
Ecoregions in the Northwest Territories
Arctic coastal tundra
Brooks-British Range tundra
Muskwa-Slave Lake forests
Northern Canadian Shield taiga

Natural geographic features of the Northwest Territories 
Landforms of Canada
 Islands of the Northwest Territories
 Lakes of the Northwest Territories
 Mountains of the Northwest Territories
 Volcanoes in the Northwest Territories
 Rivers of the Northwest Territories

Geology of the Northwest Territories
 Fossiliferous stratigraphic units in the Northwest Territories

World Heritage Sites in the Northwest Territories

Demography of the Northwest Territories 

Demographics of Northwest Territories
Census agglomeration of the Northwest Territories

Government and politics of the Northwest Territories 

Politics of the Northwest Territories

Form of government: territory
Capital of the Northwest Territories: Yellowknife
Elections in the Northwest Territories
Political parties in the Northwest Territories: Consensus government
Plebiscites in the Northwest Territories

Government of the Northwest Territories 
Northwest Territories § Government

 Consensus government in Canada

Executive branch of the government of the Northwest Territories 

 Head of state: Commissioner of the Northwest Territories
 Head of government: Premier of the Northwest Territories
 List of premiers of the Northwest Territories
 Executive Council of the Northwest Territories

Legislative branch of the government of the Northwest Territories 

 Legislative Assembly of the Northwest Territories (Unicameral)
 Speaker of the Legislative Assembly of the Northwest Territories
 List of Northwest Territories Legislative Assemblies
 Capitol: Northwest Territories Legislative Building
 List of Canadian territorial senators

Other government establishments 
 Liquor Licensing Board (Northwest Territories)
 Cannabis in the Northwest Territories
 Northwest Territories Human Rights Commission
 Language Bureau of the Northwest Territories (defunct)

Judicial system of the Northwest Territories 

Court system of Canada
 Territorial Court of the Northwest Territories (criminal and family court)
 Supreme Court of the Northwest Territories (trial court)
 Court of Appeal for the Northwest Territories

Local government in the Northwest Territories

Administrative divisions of the Northwest Territories 

 Communities of the Northwest Territories
 Northwest Territories (electoral district)

Regions of the Northwest Territories 

Regions of the Northwest Territories

Municipalities of the Northwest Territories 
Municipalities of the Northwest Territories

 City in the Northwest Territories: Yellowknife
 Mayor of Yellowknife
 Yellowknife City Council
 Towns in the Northwest Territories
 Ghost towns in the Northwest Territories
 Village in the Northwest Territories: Fort Simpson

Culture of the Northwest Territories 

Culture of the Northwest Territories

Curling in the Northwest Territories
 Languages of the Northwest Territories
 Museums in the Northwest Territories
Music of the Northwest Territories
 Order of the Northwest Territories
 Same-sex marriage in the Northwest Territories
 Symbols of the Northwest Territories
 Coat of arms of the Northwest Territories
 Flag of the Northwest Territories
 Tartan of the Northwest Territories
 Scouting and Guiding in the Northwest Territories
 World Heritage Sites in the Northwest Territories
 Nahanni National Park Reserve
 Wood Buffalo National Park

Indigenous peoples of the Northwest Territories 
Indigenous peoples in Northern Canada

Economy and infrastructure of the Northwest Territories 

Economy of the Northwest Territories
Radio stations in the Northwest Territories
Energy in the Northwest Territories
Mining in the Northwest Territories

Transportation in the Northwest Territories 
Northwest Territories § Transportation
 Airports in the Northwest Territories
 Airlines of the Northwest Territories
 Highways of the Northwest Territories
 Public transit of the Northwest Territories

Education in the Northwest Territories 

Education in Northwest Territories
Schools in the Northwest Territories
 List of Canadian primary and secondary examinations
 Standardized Testing in Northwest Territories
School districts in the Northwest Territories

Higher education in the Northwest Territories 
Higher education in the Northwest Territories
Colleges in the Northwest Territories
Aurora College
Collège nordique francophone

Bibliography 
Bibliography of the Northwest Territories

See also 

 Outline of Canada
 Outline of geography

References

External links 

Northwest Territories
 
Northwest Territories